Buckhurst Hill East is an electoral ward in Epping Forest, UK and is one of two wards that represent Buckhurst Hill. The present councillors for this ward are Steven Neville and Simon Heap both representing the Green Party.

This ward has two seats in the District Council:
 Seat 01: last vote 2018 / 2022 next vote
 Seat 02: last vote 2021 / 2024 next vote

2018 Local Election: Seat 1

2021 Local Election: Seat 2

See also
Buckhurst Hill West

Wards of Epping Forest District